Muhammad Ayub Shah is a Pakistani politician who is currently serving as a member of the Gilgit-Baltistan Council since 12 November 2021. 
Muhammad Ayub Shah was born in 1964 in Yasin VAlley to a Baigal family. He completed his primly and secondary education in his native village and for higher education he moved to Karachi. He done his graduation from University of Karachi.  
Muhammad Ayub Shah started his political career from Karachi University, where he join PSF, Peoples Student Federation a student union of Pakistan People Party. In 2022, he contested a by election as independent candidate from NA21 Ghizer 3 but was unsuccessful losing to Ghulam Muhammad of PPP that time. Similarly in 2004 Ayub Shah contested election from same constituency and lose to Gulam Muhammad again by few votes margin. In 2009 election Ayub Shah again contested election as independent candidate from GBLA 21 Ghizer and defeated the then General Sectary of Pakistan People Party Ghulam Muhammad. He then joined Pakistan Peoples Party become member Gilgit Baltistan Assembly from 2009-2015.
In 2015 and 2020 elections he contested election from PPP ticket lost to Raja Jahanzeb and Gulam Muhammad. 
In 2021 Pakistan People Party awarded their ticket to Muhammad Ayub Shah to contest in GB Council election and Ayub Shah came victorious after getting a decisive vote of a nationalist leader Nawaz Khan Naji. Muhammad Ayub Shah bring a change in the politics of Pakistan by being so loyal, honest, compassion and trust worthy. He believes that their no space of bribery, nepotism and lie in his politics. 
 He also served as a member of the Gilgit-Baltistan Assembly from 2009 to 2014.He belongs to Pakistan Peoples Party

References

Living people
Pakistan People's Party politicians
Gilgit-Baltistan MLAs 2009–2014
Members of the Gilgit-Baltistan Council
People from Ghizer District
Year of birth missing (living people)